Abhinav Manohar Sadarangani (born 16 September 1994) is an Indian cricketer. He made his Twenty20 debut on 16 November 2021, for Karnataka in the preliminary quarter-finals of the 2021–22 Syed Mushtaq Ali Trophy, where he top-scored in the match with 70 not out. He made his List A debut on 19 December 2021, also for Karnataka, in the preliminary quarter-finals of the 2021–22 Vijay Hazare Trophy.

In February 2022, he was bought by the Gujarat Titans in the auction for the 2022 Indian Premier League tournament.

References

External links
 

1994 births
Living people
Indian cricketers
Gujarat Titans cricketers
Karnataka cricketers